Kauffman Stadium, often called "The K", is a baseball stadium located in Kansas City, Missouri. It is home to the Kansas City Royals of Major League Baseball (MLB). It is part of the Truman Sports Complex together with the adjacent Arrowhead Stadium, home of the Kansas City Chiefs of the National Football League (NFL). The stadium is named for Ewing Kauffman, the founder and first owner of the Royals. It opened in 1973 as Royals Stadium and was named for Kauffman twenty years later on July 2, 1993. Since its last major renovation in 2009, the listed seating capacity is 37,903.

Kauffman Stadium was built specifically for baseball during an era when building multisport "cookie-cutter" stadiums  was commonplace. It is often held up along with Dodger Stadium (1962) in Los Angeles as one of the best examples of modernist stadium design. It is currently the only stadium in the American League to be named after a person and is also one of eight stadiums in Major League Baseball that does not have a corporate-sponsored name. The stadium is the sixth-oldest stadium in the majors and has hosted the 1973 and the 2012 MLB All-Star Games, along with Royals home games during the 1980, 1985, 2014, and 2015 World Series. Between 2007 and 2009, Kauffman Stadium underwent a $250 million renovation, which included updates and upgrades in fan amenities, a new Royals hall of fame area, and other updates throughout the facility.

In 2022, the Royals announced intentions to build and open a stadium in downtown Kansas City before the team's lease agreement with Jackson County expires at the end of 2030.

History
In 1967, voters in Jackson County approved the bonds for the Truman Sports Complex, which replaced the multipurpose Municipal Stadium and featured a football stadium for the Kansas City Chiefs and a baseball stadium for the Kansas City Athletics. The owner of the Athletics, Charles O. Finley, had just signed a new lease to remain in Kansas City. The proposal of the Truman Sports Complex was unusual, as conventional wisdom at the time held that separate football and baseball stadiums were not commercially viable. Before the 1968 season, however, Finley moved the A's to Oakland, California, and their brand-new multi-purpose stadium.

After the move, Senator Stuart Symington of Missouri threatened to press for the revocation of baseball's anti-trust exemption if they did not give Kansas City a new team. Major League Baseball responded by hastily granting expansion franchises to four cities, including a Kansas City team owned by local pharmaceutical magnate Ewing Kauffman. The other expansion team in the American League, the Seattle Pilots, were without a suitable stadium in 1969 and the accelerated schedule forced by Symington led to their bankruptcy after just one season. In 1970, they relocated to Milwaukee, Wisconsin, as the Milwaukee Brewers. With lawsuits pending, Seattle returned to the majors with the Mariners in 1977.

Jackson County continued its plans to build a new ballpark. Like the rest of the complex, it was designed by Kivett and Myers, and constructed by the joint venture of the Sharp, Kidde, and Webb construction firms. Royals Stadium broke ground on July 11, 1968, and was opened in on April 10, 1973, with a 12–1 win over the Texas Rangers that saw 39,464 fans in attendance. Five weeks later, Nolan Ryan of the California Angels threw the first of his seven no-hitters, blanking the Royals 3–0, three walks away from a perfect game. Two months later on July 24, the stadium hosted the first of its two All-Star Games.

Following the 1976 regular season, the Royals competed in the first postseason game of their  history on October 9, but lost 4–1 at home to the New York Yankees in the ALCS. The Royals won the next game 6–3 on October 10 for their first postseason win in Royals Stadium.

The first World Series game held in Kansas City was on October 17, 1980, against the Philadelphia Phillies. In the first inning, George Brett hit a home run down the right field line, and the Royals recorded their first-ever World Series win, 4–3 in ten innings, but lost the Series in six games.

On October 11, 1985, in Game 3 of the ALCS,  Brett hit two home runs off Toronto Blue Jays pitcher Doyle Alexander, made a back-handed stop at third base to throw out a runner at home, and recorded the final out to give the Royals a much-needed 6–5 win. The Royals went on to win the American League pennant in seven games.

Two weeks later, on October 27, the Royals clinched their first World Series title in franchise history, winning Game 7 in Royals Stadium. Led by the pitching of Bret Saberhagen, Darryl Motley's two-run home run, and George Brett's four hits, the Royals beat the St. Louis Cardinals 11–0; Motley caught the title-clinching out. The Royals were the first team in the history of the World Series to lose the first two games of the series at home and come back to win.

In 2012, the stadium hosted its second All-Star Game, which the National League won 8–0.

The stadium hosted the Royals' first playoff game in nearly 29 years when the city's former team, the Athletics, came to town in 2014 for the Wild Card Game. Despite trailing 7–3 in the eighth inning, Kansas City rallied to win 9-8 and advanced to the ALDS. They won their ALDS, the ALCS, and hosted Games 1, 2, 6, and 7 of the World Series, but fell to the San Francisco Giants.

In 2015, Kansas City returned to the playoffs, this time as the top seed in the American League. Games 1, 2, and 5 of the ALDS against the Houston Astros were played at the stadium, with the Royals winning Games 2 and 5, as well as Games 1, 2, and 6 of the ALCS against the Toronto Blue Jays, with the Royals winning all three games. The stadium hosted games 1 and 2 of the World Series against the New York Mets as a result of the American League winning the All-Star Game 6–3. The Royals won Game 1 (5-4 in 14 innings) and game 2 (7-1), as well and closed out the Mets in five games to win the 2015 World Series.

In 2020, Kansas City-based design firm Pendulum unveiled a concept for a potential new downtown baseball stadium, showing an intimate facility with unique amenities. In November 2022, team owner John Sherman announced the franchise's intention to leave Kauffman Stadium before the lease ends in 2030, with intentions of building a new stadium in downtown Kansas City.

Features

Kauffman Stadium was the only baseball-only park built in the majors (not counting temporary facilities) from 1966 to 1991.  It was one of the few baseball-only facilities built in the majors during the heyday of the cookie-cutter stadium era, and is one of two such facilities (with Dodger Stadium) that are still active and were never converted for use as multi-purpose stadiums.

Although a baseball-only facility, its design took several stylistic cues from the multi-purpose stadiums of the day, plus the Googie style that was more prevalent in the decades prior.  The main stadium itself is primarily concrete, with a smooth, uncovered concrete facade. The stands wrap around the infield and end at the foul poles, with smaller bleacher sections (or "outfield plazas," as the Royals call them) in the outfield. In their book, The Ultimate Baseball Road Trip, Josh Pahigian and Kevin O'Connell wrote that it is essentially one-third of a cookie-cutter stadium, containing only the seats in a cookie-cutter stadium that provide the best views for baseball. The upper deck is quite steep, though not as high as other parks built during this time. Many minor-league stadiums built in the 1980s and early 1990s, as well as Guaranteed Rate Field in Chicago, employ a similar design.
The park's best-known feature is the fountain and waterfall display (known as the Water Spectacular) behind the right-field fence. At , it is the largest privately funded fountain in the world.  The fountains are on display before and after the game and between innings, while the waterfalls are constantly flowing.

When the stadium was originally built, Kansas City was the westernmost major league city other than those along the Pacific Coast  (1,600 mi. [2,600 km] away), which was a major reason why the Royals initially decided to use a faster-draining AstroTurf surface. The Royals' home territory included a large swath of the Great Plains and Rockies, and Kauffman didn't want fans who drove many hundreds of miles to go home without seeing the game completed. The Truman Sports Complex's legendary groundskeeper, George Toma, best known as the head groundskeeper for every Super Bowl, thus had the job of maintaining two carpets for most of his career.  He also maintained the surface at Arrowhead Stadium, which had AstroTurf from 1972 through 1993.  However, Toma has said that artificial turf requires a good deal of maintenance as well; his crews were able to keep Royals Stadium's original carpet for two decades, somewhat longer than the typical lifetime for outdoor artificial turf. This is also due to the fact that Kauffman Stadium has never hosted a football game, and has no movable seating, thus avoiding the wear and tear typical of cookie-cutter stadiums.

The stadium's AstroTurf was replaced by grass for the 1995 season. As part of the project,  perforated tiles were installed at  centers across the entire field in order to improve drainage.

In 2014, the Royals started placing a "W" on the Hall of Fame wall for every home win, similar to the Chicago Cubs hoisting a white flag with a blue "W" at Wrigley Field for every Cub home win.

Renovations

Prior to the 1991 season, a Sony Jumbotron full-color video board was installed beyond the left field wall.

They were returned to their original dimensions prior to the 2005 season.

On opening Day 1999, minor renovations were debuted, including the addition of the "Crown Club" premium seating area behind home plate between the dugouts, and dugout level suites. Kauffman Stadium's seats originally featured a descending color scheme of red, gold, and orange, similar to Arrowhead Stadium; the original field level seats in Kauffman Stadium were replaced by dark blue seats, and by 2000, the gold loge level seats and red upper level seats were all replaced by dark blue seats, the field level seats also getting cupholders.

On April 4, 2006, Jackson County voters approved a 0.375% sales tax increase to fund plans to renovate the Truman Sports Complex. As part of this measure, every Jackson County residential address was to receive vouchers good for 50% off two tickets at Royals games on certain nights.  The construction began with a ceremonial groundbreaking inside Kauffman Stadium on October 3, 2007, with completion of Kauffman Stadium in time for Opening Day in 2009, and full renovation of the complex (including nearby Arrowhead Stadium) by 2010, depending upon cost overruns. The team committed to a lease that will keep them in Kansas City until 2030, an extension of their current lease expiration of 2015.

The improvements to Kauffman Stadium included the following:

Reducing seating capacity to 37,903
Four new entry ticket gates
Enhanced vertical circulation to all seating levels
Wider concourses
Two widened vomitorium portals in the upper deck
Two widened vomitorium portals in the field level
New and upgraded concessions and toilet amenities on all concourses
New press facilities
New HD scoreboard, dubbed "Crown Vision," and control room
360-degree outfield concourse
Fountain view terraces
Outfield kids' area
"Taste of KC" food court
Right field sports bar-themed restaurant
Left field Hall of Fame and conference center
New group sales areas

The new HD scoreboard was one of the first features to be installed. It replaced the matrix board in the shape of the Royals logo that had been in use in the park since its opening, along with the video board in left field. It was adorned with a crown, giving it an appearance similar to the old matrix board. The new scoreboard was ready for Opening Day 2008. The Kauffman Stadium screen was eventually surpassed by the new scoreboard at Seattle's T-Mobile Park in 2013. The display was assembled in 55 separate segments, including an active bottom taper to resemble the shield in the Royals logo. The video scoreboard alone cost $8.3 million, and the control room that operates it is staffed with 17 people on game days. Strobe lights atop the crown flash after every Royals home run.

A second proposal on the April 2006 ballot would have installed a rolling roof at the Truman Sports Complex. The roof could have been moved to cover either Kauffman Stadium or Arrowhead Stadium when needed. The proposal was defeated by less than 4,000 votes.

Concerts

Buck O'Neil legacy seat

Beginning with the 2007 season, the Royals had a red seat placed in the stadium amongst the all-blue seats behind home plate to honor Buck O'Neil. Every game, there will be a person who embodies the spirit of Buck O'Neil selected from community nominees to sit in that seat, formerly occupied by O'Neil. The seat is located behind home plate in what was Section 101, Row C, Seat 1, until 2008. Due to the stadium renovations and accompanying section renumbering in 2009, the seat number is now Section 127, Row C, Seat 9, and the seat bottom is now padded. O'Neil played for the Kansas City Monarchs of the Negro leagues from 1937 to 1955.

Statues
Four statues lay out in the outfield concourse behind the fountains. Three of the statues are located in right field (George Brett, Dick Howser and Frank White). The fourth is located in left field, and is the former Royals owner Ewing Kauffman and his wife Muriel.

Notes
:  Candlestick Park, Angel Stadium, and Jarry Park Stadium were all originally built as baseball-only facilities. Candlestick Park has been demolished, and Jarry Park Stadium was renovated into Stade IGA, a tennis-specific stadium with only a small portion of the original stadium present. Both Candlestick Park and Angel Stadium were converted to multi-purpose facilities. Anaheim Stadium, now known as Angel Stadium of Anaheim, was re-converted into a baseball-only facility in 1996, though that venue continues to host high school playoff football games.

References

External links

Stadium site on MLB.com
The History of Kauffman Stadium
A taste of the future Kauffman Stadium

Kansas City Royals stadiums
Major League Baseball venues
Sports venues completed in 1973
1973 establishments in Missouri
Sports venues in Kansas City, Missouri
Baseball venues in Missouri
Sports venues in Missouri